Championship Manager 2 is a football management computer game in the Sports Interactive's Championship Manager series. It was released in September 1995 for PC. An Amiga version was released in 1997.

New features 
Championship Manager 2 introduced a far better quality of graphics compared to previous versions. The game included SVGA graphics and photorealistic background pictures. Possibly the most notable new feature was the audio commentary engine. As well as the traditional text-based match commentary, there was also optional voice commentary on CD ROM, provided by famous British football commentator Clive Tyldesley. The game greatly expanded the number of stats and tactical possibilities, and made transfers and contract negotiations more realistic, with the Bosman ruling included in future updates.

Another milestone was the inclusion of playable Scottish leagues, albeit only in the PC version. For the first time in the series there was a selection of leagues to choose from at the start of the game - only one could be run at a time, however.

Gameplay 
In terms of the underlying gameplay, not a great deal had been changed since the original Championship Manager. The look and feel had been improved but it was still very much a text-based, menu-driven game and the user interface was almost identical to previous games, albeit at a much higher resolution.

Versions 
Two new versions of Championship Manager 2 were later released allowing users to play leagues from across Europe. One version contained the Spanish, Belgian and Dutch leagues, the other contained French, German and Italian, leagues. Only one league could be run at a time but this was still a big milestone for the series and signalled the intent of Sports Interactive to expand the Championship Manager universe across the globe.

The Amiga port was developed by Sterling Games. The Amiga version did not include all the features of the PC version, including the Scottish League, international management, player histories and backgrounds). Furthermore, it could not be installed to a hard drive.

Reception 
The new game brought critical reviews including 49% from PC Gamer who urged the series to "stop plastering its face with make-up" and "allow itself to be led quietly off to the old people's home, where it will be remembered kindly".

References

External links 
 Official Championship Manager website

 - Information for the Amiga Version of CM2 and CM2 96/97

1995 video games
Amiga games
Domark games
Eidos Interactive games
Multiplayer hotseat games
Video game sequels
Windows games
Association football management video games
Video games developed in the United Kingdom
Multiplayer and single-player video games